Francis Livingstone Shand (23 June 1855 – 5 June 1921) was an English first-class cricketer.

Shand was born at Old Charlton. He was educated at Harrow School. He made his debut in first-class cricket for the Gentlemen of England against a combined Oxford and Cambridge Universities Past and Present cricket team at The Oval in 1874. Two years later, he appeared twice in first-class cricket, appearing the South in the North v South and for the Gentlemen of the South against the Players of the North. His final two first-class appearances came in 1889 for the Gentlemen of England against Oxford University, and for A. J. Webbe's XI against Cambridge University. In six first-class matches, Shand scored 49 runs with a high score of 17, while with the ball he took 17 wickets at an average of 9.88. His best figures of 6 for 32, which was his only five wicket haul, came against Oxford University in 1889. Outside of cricket, Shand was a land proprietor in British Ceylon. He died in June 1921 at Denham, Buckinghamshire.

References

External links

1855 births
1921 deaths
People from Charlton, London
People educated at Harrow School
English cricketers
Gentlemen of England cricketers
Gentlemen of the South cricketers
North v South cricketers
A. J. Webbe's XI cricketers
People from British Ceylon